Luis Gustavo Melere da Silva (born 10 March 1991), known as Luisinho, is a Brazilian footballer who plays for Retrô as a winger.

References

1991 births
Living people
Brazilian footballers
Brazilian expatriate footballers
Campeonato Brasileiro Série B players
Campeonato Brasileiro Série D players
Saudi Professional League players
Paraná Clube players
Clube Atlético Bragantino players
Atlético Clube Goianiense players
Santa Cruz Futebol Clube players
Esporte Clube Bahia players
Al-Faisaly FC players
Al-Wehda Club (Mecca) players
Retrô Futebol Clube Brasil players
Brazilian expatriate sportspeople in Saudi Arabia
Expatriate footballers in Saudi Arabia
Association football wingers
Footballers from Rio de Janeiro (city)